Earl Wilfred Winsor (1918 – April 10, 1989) was a master mariner and politician in Newfoundland. He represented Labrador North from 1956 to 1971 and Fogo from 1971 to 1979 in the Newfoundland House of Assembly.

The son of Joshua and Blanche Winsor, he was born in Wesleyville and was educated there and at Memorial University. He worked as a wireless operator and served in the merchant navy during World War II. After the war, he was captain of several ships in the Labrador area. He was also a director of the Winsor Trading Company.

Winsor served in the Newfoundland cabinet as Minister of Labrador Affairs and then as Minister of Fisheries. He was a member of the Masonic Order, the Orange Association, the St. John's Board of Trade and the Royal Canadian Legion.

A ferry operating in the Fogo area was renamed the MV Captain Earl W. Winsor in 1998.

References 

1918 births
1989 deaths
Liberal Party of Newfoundland and Labrador MHAs
Canadian military personnel of World War II
Members of the Executive Council of Newfoundland and Labrador
Memorial University of Newfoundland alumni